Cyndy Violette (born August 19, 1959 in Queens, New York) is an American professional poker player who won a World Series of Poker bracelet in 2004.

Background
Violette often played poker with family members as a child.  Her family relocated to Las Vegas when she was 12 years old; Violette took to playing casino poker once she reached the legal age of 21. She spent a short time as a casino employee, working as a blackjack and poker dealer.

Career

In 1984, Violette cashed in a poker tournament in Lake Tahoe and used the proceeds to launch a professional poker career.  She later took the top prize of $74,000 at a seven-card stud tournament at the Golden Nugget; at the time this was the biggest tournament prize ever won by a woman. Shortly thereafter, she married her second husband, and took a two-year hiatus from poker.

In 1990, Violette returned to the poker scene by winning $62,000 in a tournament at Caesars Palace.  She maintained her residence in Washington state but split time between Las Vegas and Los Angeles. In 1993, Violette divorced her husband and relocated to Atlantic City.  She continued to work the poker tournament circuit and was a regular participant in the World Series of Poker (WSOP).  She has also competed on the World Poker Tour.

At the 2004 World Series of Poker, Violette won a bracelet in the seven-card stud high-low split tournament. She was one of three women (Kathy Liebert and Annie Duke being the others) to win a gold bracelet in an open tournament in that year's WSOP.  As of 2014, her total live tournament winnings exceed $1,350,000. Her 35 cashes at the WSOP account for $907,924 of those winnings.

World Series of Poker Bracelets

Personal life
She has one child, a daughter named Shannon. She divorced her husband in 1993.

References

External links
World Poker Tour profile
Poker Pages profile

1959 births
Living people
American poker players
Female poker players
World Series of Poker bracelet winners